Chikai may refer to:

 "Chikai" (Eiko Shimamiya song), 2009
 "Chikai" (Do As Infinity song), 2011
 "Chikai" (Utada Hikaru song), 2018
 "Chikai" or "The Oath", a volume of manga series One Piece, 1998

See also

Chiki